Wilhelm Knut "Mulle" Petersén (2 October 1906 – 11 December 1988) was a Swedish ice hockey and bandy player. He competed in the 1928 and 1936 Winter Olympics and finished in second and fifth place, respectively. Between 1928 and 1936 he played 20 international matches and won a European title in 1932.

Petersén was one three people who competed internationally in association football, bandy and ice hockey, and won Swedish titles in all these sports. As an ice hockey player, he won national titles with AIK in 1934 and 1935, and was the best Swedish scorer in 1928, 1932, 1933 and 1937. In association football, he was a 1932 Swedish champion with AIK and twice played internationally in 1930. In bandy, Petersén won a Swedish title in 1931 and twice played internationally in 1931–32.

After retiring from competitions, Petersén ran his Mulle Coffee-Roastery in Duvbo, Stockholm.

References

External links

Swedish ice hockey players
Swedish bandy players
1906 births
1988 deaths
AIK Fotboll players
AIK IF players
AIK Bandy players
Södertälje SK players
Ice hockey players at the 1928 Winter Olympics
Ice hockey players at the 1936 Winter Olympics
Olympic silver medalists for Sweden
Olympic ice hockey players of Sweden
Olympic medalists in ice hockey
Medalists at the 1928 Winter Olympics
Association footballers not categorized by position
Swedish footballers
Ice hockey people from Stockholm